The 2019 European Canoe Slalom Championships took place in Pau, France under the auspices of the European Canoe Association (ECA). It was the 20th edition of the competition and Pau hosted the event for the first time. The events took place at the Pau-Pyrénées Whitewater Stadium from 29 May to 2 June 2019.

Medal summary

Men

Canoe

Kayak

Women

Canoe

Kayak

Medals Table

References

External links 
 European Canoe Association
 Official website

European Canoe Slalom Championships
European Canoe Slalom Championships
European Canoe Slalom Championships
European Canoe Slalom Championships
European Canoe Slalom Championships